Bertrand was the name of a defunct provincial electoral district in the province of Quebec, Canada.  It 
was located in the Montérégie region, and is not to be confused with the later, entirely different Bertrand electoral district located in the Lanaudière and Laurentides regions, which re-used the name but otherwise has nothing in common.

It was created for the 1981 election from parts of the existing Chambly and Verchères districts. Its final election was in 1989.  It disappeared in the 1994 election and its successor electoral district was Marguerite-D'Youville.

It was in this electoral district that Robert Bourassa was elected in a by-election on June 3, 1985 as part of his political comeback after returning as Quebec Liberal Party leader, only to be defeated by the Parti Québécois candidate in the 1985 general election a few months later.  Bourassa subsequently ran in a by-election in Saint-Laurent on January 20, 1986 and won there.

Members of National Assembly
Denis Lazure, Parti Québécois (1981–1984)
Robert Bourassa, Liberal (1985 by-election)
Jean-Guy Parent, Parti Québécois (1985–1989)
François Beaulne, Parti Québécois (1989–1994)

Election results

External links
 Election results (National Assembly)
 Election results (Quebecpolitique.com)

Former provincial electoral districts of Quebec